Miguel López González (born 24 September 1949) is a Cuban footballer. He competed in the men's tournament at the 1980 Summer Olympics.

References

External links
 

1949 births
Living people
Cuban footballers
Cuba international footballers
Olympic footballers of Cuba
Footballers at the 1980 Summer Olympics
Place of birth missing (living people)
Association football defenders